Tajikistan participated in the 2014 Asian Games in Incheon, South Korea from 19 September to 4 October 2014.

Medal summary

Medalists

Archery

Men's recurve

Women's recurve

Athletics

Men's

Women

Beach volleyball

Men

Women

Boxing

Men

Women

Canoeing

Sprint
Men

Football

Men

Judo

Men

Karate

Men's kumite

Shooting

Men
Rifle

Women
Rifle

Soft tennis

Men

Swimming

Men

Taekwondo

Men

Women

Weightlifting (men)

Wrestling

Men's freestyle

Men's Greco-Roman

Wushu

Men's taolu

Women's taolu

References

Nations at the 2014 Asian Games
2014